San Bernardino Verbano is a comune (municipality) in the Province of Verbano-Cusio-Ossola in the Italian region Piedmont, located about  northeast of Turin and about  northwest of Verbania.

San Bernardino Verbano borders the following municipalities: Cossogno, Mergozzo, Premosello-Chiovenda, Verbania. Part of the territory is included in the Val Grande National Park.

References

Cities and towns in Piedmont